The following pages contain lists of legal terms:
List of Latin legal terms
List of legal abbreviations
List of legal abbreviations (canon law)
on Wiktionary:
 Appendix: English legal terms
 Appendix: Glossary of legal terms

See also
:Category:Law-related lists
Outline of law: Lists
List of Latin phrases

Law-related lists